İlhan Onat (5 December 1929 – 13 May 2013) was a Turkish chess player, pharmacist. He was three-time Turkish Chess Champion.

Biography 
Onat was born in Istanbul in 1929 and moved to Izmir in 1930 with his family. He started playing chess at İzmir Atatürk High School, graduated from the Faculty of Pharmacy of Istanbul University. Onat, who met strong players while he was a student in Istanbul, took a break from chess when he returned to Izmir. As a chess player, he took part in the 17th, 18th, 25th, 26th and 27st Chess Olympiad Turkish National Team. He won the 1974, 1975 and 1982 Turkish Chess Championships.

While he was still alive, the International İlhan Onat Chess Tournament was organized in his memory in 2012 for his contributions to Turkish Chess Sport.

Onat died in 2013 in İzmir.

Achievements 

 1974 Turkish Chess Championship – Champion
 1975 Turkish Chess Championship – Champion
 1982 Turkish Chess Championship – Champion

References

External links 
 İlhan Onat at Chess Games

Turkish chess players
Istanbul University alumni
1929 births
2013 deaths